Heraeus is a genus of dirt-colored seed bugs in the family Rhyparochromidae. There are at least 40 described species in Heraeus.

Species
These 40 species belong to the genus Heraeus:

 Heraeus alvarengai Dellapé, P. M., Melo & Henry, 2016 c g
 Heraeus annulatus Dellapé, P. M., Melo & Henry, 2016 c g
 Heraeus antennalis Dellapé, P. M., Melo & Henry, 2016 c g
 Heraeus apicalis Dellapé, P. M., Melo & Henry, 2016 c
 Heraeus bahiensis Dellapé, P. M., Melo & Henry, 2016 c g
 Heraeus baranowskii Dellapé, P. M., Melo & Henry, 2016 c g
 Heraeus bolivianus Dellapé, P. M., Melo & Henry, 2016 c g
 Heraeus brevirostris Dellapé, P. M., Melo & Henry, 2016 c
 Heraeus caliginosus Slater, J.A. & R.M. Baranowski, 1994 c g
 Heraeus chamamecinus Dellapé, P. M., Melo & Henry, 2016 c g
 Heraeus cinnamomeus Barber, 1948 i c g
 Heraeus concolor Slater, J.A. & R.M. Baranowski, 1994 c g
 Heraeus coquilletti Barber, 1914 i c g b
 Heraeus costalis Dellapé, P. M., Melo & Henry, 2016 c g
 Heraeus dominicanus Dellapé, P. M., Melo & Henry, 2016 c g
 Heraeus ecuatorianus Dellapé, P. M., Melo & Henry, 2016 c g
 Heraeus eximius Distant, 1882 i
 Heraeus guttatus (Dallas, W.S., 1852) c g
 Heraeus hollyae c g
 Heraeus illitus Distant, W.L., 1882 c g
 Heraeus inca Dellapé, P. M., Melo & Henry, 2016 c g
 Heraeus itzelae Dellapé, P. M., Melo & Henry, 2016 c g
 Heraeus loja Dellapé, P. M., Melo & Henry, 2016 c g
 Heraeus mesoamericanus Dellapé, P. M., Melo & Henry, 2016 c g
 Heraeus mexicanus Dellapé, P. M., Melo & Henry, 2016 c g
 Heraeus morganae Dellapé, P. M., Melo & Henry, 2016 c g
 Heraeus nicaraguensis Dellapé, P. M., Melo & Henry, 2016 c g
 Heraeus pacificus Barber, H.G., 1925 c g
 Heraeus pallidinervis Dellapé, P. M., Melo & Henry, 2016 c g
 Heraeus panamaensis Dellapé, P. M., Melo & Henry, 2016 c g
 Heraeus penai Dellapé, P. M., Melo & Henry, 2016 c g
 Heraeus plebejus Stal, 1874 i c g b
 Heraeus pulchellus Barber, H.G., 1954 c g
 Heraeus setosus Dellapé, P. M., Melo & Henry, 2016 c g
 Heraeus similis Dellapé, P. M., Melo & Henry, 2016 c g
 Heraeus spinosus Dellapé, P. M., Melo & Henry, 2016 c g
 Heraeus splendens Dellapé, P. M., Melo & Henry, 2016 c g
 Heraeus steineri Dellapé, P. M., Melo & Henry, 2016 c g
 Heraeus tiputini Dellapé, P. M., Melo & Henry, 2016 c g
 Heraeus triguttatus (Guérin-Méneville, 1857) i c g b

Data sources: i = ITIS, c = Catalogue of Life, g = GBIF, b = Bugguide.net

References

External links

 

Rhyparochromidae
Articles created by Qbugbot